Frank O'Brien (2 May 1900 – 14 November 1986) was  a former Australian rules footballer who played with Richmond in the Victorian Football League (VFL).

Notes

External links 
		

1900 births
1986 deaths
Australian rules footballers from Victoria (Australia)
Richmond Football Club players